Tristerix verticillatus is a species of Tristerix found in Argentina, Bolivia, and Chile.

References

External links

verticillatus
Flora of the Andes